The Sound of Echo is an EP that was released by the band Echo & the Bunnymen in February 1984. The EP is also known as the Never Stop EP and the Echo and the Bunnymen EP. The EP takes tracks from their 1980 Crocodiles album, their 1983 Porcupine album and adds a non-album single and a live track. The EP was released on 12-inch vinyl. The live track, "Do It Clean", was recorded at the Royal Albert Hall on 18 July 1983.

Track listings
All tracks written by Will Sergeant, Ian McCulloch, Les Pattinson and Pete de Freitas.

"Never Stop" – 4:44
"Rescue" – 4:30
"The Cutter" – 3:55
"The Back of Love" – 3:12
"Do It Clean" (live) – 6:36

Personnel

Musicians
Ian McCulloch – vocals, guitar
Will Sergeant – lead guitar
Les Pattinson – bass
Pete de Freitas – drums

Production
Bill Drummond – producer
David Balfe – producer
Hugh Jones – producer
Ian Broudie – producer
Martyn Atkins – sleeve design

References

1984 EPs
Echo & the Bunnymen EPs